The 1911–12 Sheffield Shield season was the 20th season of the Sheffield Shield, the domestic first-class cricket competition of Australia. New South Wales won the championship.

Table

Statistics

Most Runs
Warren Bardsley 450

Most Wickets
Tibby Cotter 28

References

Sheffield Shield
Sheffield Shield
Sheffield Shield seasons